Belfast Community Radio or BCR, was a radio station that broadcast to Belfast between 1990 and 1996. The station broadcast from the basement of Russell Court Complex on Belfast's Lisburn Road. It was replaced by Belfast CityBeat.

History

BCR was launched at 7:30 a.m. on 6 April 1990 with Rick Nugent who was the first presenter, the first song was "Feet of a Dancer" by Maira O'Connell.

In 1992, in attempt to boost audience the station adopted a 'Classic Hits Format' and became known as Classic Trax BCR but by 1994 had reverted to 96.7 BCR.

In 1995, the word 'community' in the title was replaced for 'city' in a further attempt to distance the station from its community roots which had failed to interest audience.

During its final month on air the station simply became known as 96.7FM.

BCR struggled to establish a listener base and was eventually relaunched as Belfast CityBeat in 1996. In contrast with its forerunner, Citybeat became a huge success and is now one of the most popular stations in Northern Ireland.

Stuart Robinson presented the final programme on BCR on 30 September 1996. The last track played was Elton John and "Sacrifice". At midnight BCR changed to Citybeat.

At the time of its demise, BCR was pulling in little over 30,000 listeners.

Former presenters
BCR presenters prior to the 1996 relaunch included Rick Nugent, Maurice Jay, Mary Johnston, Eddie McDermott Davy Cunningham, Stuart Robinson, Owen Beers, Mal Reynolds, Noel Hyndman, Phil Doyle, Lawrence John, David Johnston, Lisa Flavelle, Olive Melville, Kenny Tosh, Paul Orr, Ricky K, Stephen Nolan, Denise Watson and Davy Cash.

External links
 transdiffusion.org - 
 geocities.com - General details on the station.

Radio stations in Northern Ireland
Defunct radio stations in the United Kingdom
Mass media in Belfast
Radio stations established in 1990
1990 establishments in Northern Ireland
Radio stations disestablished in 1996
1996 disestablishments in Northern Ireland